The men's long jump world record progression lists records ratified by the International Association of Athletics Federations (IAAF) starting in 1912. The inaugural record was the  performance by Peter O'Connor in 1901.

Record progression

Low altitude record progression 1965–1991

The IAAF considers marks set at high altitude as acceptable for record consideration. However, high altitude can significantly assist long jump performances.

This list contains the progression of long jump marks set at low altitude starting with the mark that stood at Beamon's record in 1968 to Powell's 1991 world record.

See also
 Women's long jump world record progression

Notes

References

Long jump
World records in athletic jumping
Long jump